Albanella is a town and comune in the province of Salerno in the Campania region of south-western Italy. It is located 51 kilometers from the city of Salerno.

Olive oil is one of the principal products of the town.

Geography
The town is located halfway between Monti Alburni and the Gulf of Salerno, on a hill commanding the plain of the Sele River. The rest of the municipal area is either flat or, between the  Sele and Calore Lucano rivers to the north and Monte Soprano (1,082 m) to the south, hilly.

History
Lying on hills rich with olive trees, Albanella was founded  in the 11th century by refugees from Paestum, seeking for a site which would be safe from Saracen raids. The most ancient settlement is in fact on the hill's side which is hidden from the sea.

Several archaeological findings are now in the National Archaeological Museum in Paestum and in the National Archaeological Museum of Naples.

Frazioni
The comune includes the following hamlets (frazioni):

Matinella 
Matinella is the largest frazione in the comune of Albanella, located about 6 km from the center of the township at the intersection of roads from Eboli (via Persano)  and Altavilla Silentina which leads to  Capaccio-Paestum, and the Provincial Road No. 11 from Ponte Barizzo which leads to Albanella. Because of the low-lying country in recent decades the village has experienced significant population growth that has brought almost a third of the municipal population.

Borgo San Cesareo 
In 1950, the government launched a series of legislative measures in Agrarian Reform. These measures, implemented in specific provinces (Campania, Lazio, Puglia, etc. ..) had the goal of expropriating the land of large landowners to local laborers and peasants. This led to the creation of the agricultural village and frazione of Borgo San Cesareo, a small village which is about 9 km from Albanella town.

San Nicola 
The frazione of San Nicola is  located halfway between Albanella town and the frazione Matinella  along the Provincial Road 11. Its development is due to the important road junction that links to Albanella and which leads to Altavilla Silentina and Eboli.

Bosco 
Bosco is an ancient frazione which takes its name from the vast forests on the slopes of the hills that once lay to the north-east of the village. After centuries of deforestation for timber and to create  land for pasture or cultivation the ancient "Bosco" forest is only a small area today of about one hundred acres, bordering the territory of Castelcivita and Roccadaspide, saved through by the WWF.

Main sights

Church of Santa Sofia 
Built in the 16th century.

Church of  St. Matthew (San Matteo) 

Dating back to 1400, this church stands in the heart of the historic center on a small hill where there was previously an old Roman settlement. The church is characterized by two aisles and a bell tower in Romanesque style, and has a great organ.

Chapel of the Congregation of SS. Rosario
It is located in the old town opposite the Church of St. Matthew. It is the newest of the three Catholic churches in Albanella, dating back to the 19th century. The external façade has a majolica panel, realized in Vietri, depicting the  Madonna del Rosario between St. Dominic and St. Catherine of Siena.

Church of  San Gennaro 
Better known as the Church of St. Anne (Chiesa di Sant'Anna)  because of the statue of the saint, it is located in the frazione of Matinella.

Church of San Giuseppe Lavoratore 
A modern church built in the 20th century located in the frazione of Borgo San Cesareo.

Wind farm 

On the hill of San Chirico, a few kilometres west of Albanella town, are ten wind turbines, visible from the Amalfi Coast.

The plant, which was established in February 2004, features ten wind turbines (model V52)  of 850 kW each producing more than 20 million kWh per year. The wind farm has been designed and developed by the IWT (Italian Wind Technology) headed the Danish multinational Vestas.

Twin towns
 Thrakomakedones (Greece)

References

External links

 Albanella official site

Cities and towns in Campania
Localities of Cilento